Fenestellidae is a family of bryozoans belonging to the order Fenestrida. The skeleton of its colonies consists of stiff branches that are interconnected by narrower crossbars (or dissepiments). The individuals of the colony (or zooids) inhabit one side of the branches in two parallel rows or two at the branch base and three or more rows further up. Zooids can be recognized as small rimmed pores (or apertures), and in well-preserved specimens the apertures are closed by centrally perforated lids. The front of the branches carries small nodes in a row or zigzag line between the apertures. Branches split (or bifurcate) from time to time giving the colonies a fan-shape or, in the genus Archimedes, create an mesh in the shape of an Archimedes screw.

Like all bryozoans, Fenestellids were epifaunal suspension feeders, that occurred between the early Ordovician and the Triassic. Fossils of this family have been found in marine sediments all over the world.

Genera
Archaefenestella
Archimedes
Bigeyina
Cavernella
Exfenestella
Fabifenestella
Fenestella
Filites
Flexifenestella
Hemitrypella
Hinganotrypa
Isotrypa
Levifenestella
Lyrocladia
Lyropora
Narynella
Ogbinofenestella
Paraptylopora
Paraseptopora
Permofenestella
Polycladiopora
Pseudounitrypa
Ptiloporella
Rectifenestella
Ryhopora

References

Prehistoric bryozoans
Prehistoric protostome families
Ordovician first appearances
Permian extinctions
Bryozoan families
Stenolaemata